Cryptandra congesta is a flowering plant in the family Rhamnaceae and is endemic to a restricted area of the south-west of Western Australia. It is a low, spreading shrub with narrowly egg-shaped or narrowly oblong leaves and clusters of white, tube-shaped flowers.

Description
The upper surface of the leaves is glabrous and there are minute teeth on the edges, especially near the tips. Flowering occurs from April to October.

Taxonomy and naming
Cryptandra congesta was first formally described in 1995 by Barbara Lynette Rye and the description was published in the journal Nuytsia. The specific epithet (congesta ) means "crowded", referring to the flowers.

Distribution and habitat
This cryptandra grows on granite, but is only known from a small area north of Denmark in the Jarrah Forest bioregion of south-western Western Australia.

Conservation status
This cryptandra is listed as "Priority Four" by the Government of Western Australia Department of Biodiversity, Conservation and Attractions, meaning that it is rare or near threatened.

References

congesta
Rosales of Australia
Flora of Western Australia
Plants described in 1995
Taxa named by Barbara Lynette Rye